The SS Canada Victory was one of 531 Victory ships built during World War II under the Emergency Shipbuilding program. She was launched by the Oregon Shipbuilding Corporation on January 12, 1944, and was completed on February 28, 1944. The ship’s United States Maritime Commission designation was VC2-S-AP3, hull number 93 (1009). The Maritime Commission turned her over to a civilian contractor, the Alaska SS Company, for operation.

World War II

The Canada Victory was used as a cargo ship in World War II. She was sent to Okinawa to supply ammunition for the Battle of Okinawa on April 27, 1945; while unloading the ammunition at Naval Base Okinawa, she was hit by a kamikaze attack airplane in cargo hold five. Two armed guards and one merchant mariner were killed, and twelve crew members were wounded in the attack. The , a fleet ocean tug, picked up survivors of the Canada Victory.
 
The Logan Victory and Hobbs Victory sank as fires on them grew. The   was able to shoot down one plane and move away from the burning ships. Canada Victory was one of three Victory ships, and one of forty-seven ships sunk by kamikaze attack during World War II.

The loss of the three Victory ships, each sunk by kamikaze attacks during the invasion of Okinawa, severely hurt the combat forces. The ships were carrying a total of 24,000 tons (54 million pounds) of ammunition; including most of the 81 mm mortar shells needed for the invasion.

The ammunition ship  arrived April 12, 1945, at Okinawa to replace the ammunition lost on the ships. More ammunition ships were not needed, as the war came to an end without the invasion of Japan, called Operation Downfall.

Honors
The crew of Naval Armed Guards on the Canada Victory''' earned Battle Stars in World War II for war action during the assault and occupation of Okinawa from April 26 to 27, 1945.

References

Sources
Sawyer, L.A. and W.H. Mitchell. Victory ships and tankers: The history of the ‘Victory’ type cargo ships and of the tankers built in the United States of America during World War II'', Cornell Maritime Press, 1974, 0-87033-182-5.
United States Maritime Commission: 
Victory Cargo Ships 

Victory ships
Ships built in Portland, Oregon
Merchant ships of the United States
1944 ships
World War II merchant ships of the United States
Ships sunk by kamikaze attack
Ammunition ships of the United States Navy